Fuel for the Fire may refer to:

 Fuel for the Fire (band)
 Fuel for the Fire (Naked Eyes album)
 Fuel for the Fire (Ari Koivunen album)
 Fuel for the Fire (EP), a 1997 EP by Impellitteri